Thomas Davis House may refer to:

Thomas Davis House (Kenton, Delaware), listed on the NRHP in Kent County, Delaware
Thomas Aspinwall Davis House, Brookline, Massachusetts, listed on the NRHP in Norfolk County, Massachusetts

See also
Davis House (disambiguation)